McCurtain or variant forms may refer to:

People
 Conchobhar Mac Curtain (1660–1724), officer in the Royal Irish Army of King James II
 Dermot Mac Curtain (born 1957), Irish hurler
 Florimond-Benjamin MacCurtain (1764–1857), French politician and soldier 
 Green McCurtain (Greenwood McCurtain, 1848–1910), Principal Chief of the Choctaw Nation
 Liam Mac Curtain an Dúna, (1658–1724), Irish poet and scholar
 Margaret MacCurtain (born 1929), Irish historian, writer and educator
 Seán McCurtin (1896–1982), Irish politician 
 Tomás Mac Curtain (1884–1920), a Lord Mayor of Cork, Ireland

Places
 McCurtain, Oklahoma, U.S
 McCurtain County, Oklahoma, U.S.

See also

 Curtain (disambiguation)
 Curtin (surname)
 Irish name